St Mary's School is a private day and boarding school in Calne, Wiltshire, for girls aged 11 to 18. The school is a registered charity.

St Mary's Calne is the top performing independent school in the South West, ranked by 2017 examination results published in The Sunday Times Schools Guide 2018, 'Parent Power'  and ranks in the top 3 best girls' boarding schools (based on A*-A grades in A Levels, 2018) in the Education Advisers' Best UK Schools list.

History 
St Mary's was founded in 1873 by Canon John Duncan, Vicar of Calne, who worked for over thirty years to establish it as an 'outstanding' girls' school.

Performance 
In the 2017 ISI report, the school received a double 'excellent' – the highest possible grade – and the pupils consistently achieve outstanding examination results (90% of 2017 leavers gained places at their first-choice university).

In figures published in January 2017 by the Department for Education (DfE) regarding 2016 A Level results, St Mary's Calne got the top score for its 'value added' – that is, how much progress students who studied A Levels made between the end of Key Stage 4 and the end of their A Level studies, compared to similar students across England. St Mary's Calne scored 'well above the national average', to be in the top 4% of schools in England with this value added score.

In A Level league tables published by The Telegraph in January 2017, based on DfE figures for 2016 A Level results, St Mary's Calne was the top performing school in the region (out of 32 schools).

Houses and Companies 
The school is divided into five Companies, all named after bishops with local connections: Edmund Rich (sometimes called Ed Rich), Grosseteste, Moberly, Osmund, and Poore. Each girl remains in the same Company throughout her time at the school. The Companies are similar to houses in other independent schools, except that they have nothing to do with the house a girl sleeps in. The Companies compete in sport, drama, music, and other activities such as quizzes, public speaking, and maths challenges.

There are seven boarding houses, for each year group from LIV to UVI. The houses are School House, St. Prisca's, St. Cecilia's, Gibbins, Joyce Walters, Florence Dyas, and Helen Wright. The newest house is Florence Dyas, the LVI house, which was opened in September 2014.

Facilities 
Around 80% of the girls board, and day girls can sleep over. Between the ages of eleven and fourteen, girls sleep in dormitories in three junior houses, each of which has a Housemistress and a Deputy Housemistress, and a Day Housemistress. After the age of fourteen, girls have their own single study room in one of four senior houses. In the sixth form, rooms are en-suite.

The school recently completed a £10.5 million boarding refurbishment programme (the Lower Sixth Form House won the 2016 West of England LABC Building Excellence awards for Best Educational Building) and a new, multi-million pound sports complex was opened in 2018.

The school has a dining room, 12,000+ book library, chapel, and theatre. St Mary's Calne's Science Department is one of just 10 schools in the UK to be awarded the Platinum Science Mark (and the first independent school in the UK to achieve this accolade)

Extracurricular activities 
('Pupils excel in a wide variety of extra-curricular activities' – ISI Report, 2017)

The range of extra-curricular activities offered by the school is broad, with music, sport, drama, and art activities offered alongside horse-riding, the Duke of Edinburgh award scheme, and other volunteering opportunities.

Headmistresses 
 Miss Richardson 1873–1876
 Miss Jones  1876–1883
 Miss Pells 1883–1885
 Miss Leeson 1885–1888
 Miss Florence Dyas  1888–1911
 Miss Rachel Donaldson  1911–1915
 Miss Marcia Matthews  1915–1945
 Miss Joyce Field  1945–1946
 Miss Elizabeth Gibbins 1946–1972
 Mrs Joyce Walters  1972–1985
 Miss Delscey Burns  1985–1996
 Mrs Carolyn Shaw  1996–2003
 Dr Helen Wright  2003–2012
 Dr Felicia Kirk  2013 to date

Notable alumnae 

 Laura Bechtolsheimer  – gold medalist at the 2012 Summer Olympics
 Nicola LeFanu – composer, academic, lecturer and director
 Clare Cameron – sister of Prime Minister David Cameron
Arabella Dorman – War Artist and portrait painter
 Lucy Hughes-Hallett – author, winner of the 2013 Samuel Johnson Prize for non-fiction
 Lady Emma Herbert – circus trapeze artist and stuntwoman
 April FitzLyon – biographer and translator
 Etelka Leadlay - conservationist
 Sara Maitland – author
 Elizabeth Moir – educationalist
Eva Rice – singer-songwriter and novelist, daughter of Tim Rice
 Belinda Stewart-Wilson – actress
Tara Sutton – war correspondent

Bibliography 
 Kay Stedmond (1986). St Mary's School Calne 1873–1986. B. A. Hathaway. .

References

External links 
 
 Profile on MyDaughter
 ISI Inspection Reports – St Margaret's Prep & Senior School
 St Mary's School – Charity Commission

Calne
Private schools in Wiltshire
Girls' schools in Wiltshire
Educational institutions established in 1873
Boarding schools in Wiltshire
1873 establishments in England
Member schools of the Girls' Schools Association
Church of England private schools in the Diocese of Salisbury